Zmeytsyno is a rural locality (a village) in Staroselskoye Rural Settlement, Mezhdurechensky District, Vologda Oblast, Russia. The population was 58 as of 2002.

Geography 
Zmeytsyno is located 29 km southwest of Shuyskoye (the district's administrative centre) by road. Staroye is the nearest rural locality.

References 

Rural localities in Mezhdurechensky District, Vologda Oblast